Hypochrosis sternaria is a moth of the family Geometridae first described by Achille Guenée in 1857. It is found from India through Southeast Asia to Sumatra and Borneo.

External links

Hypochrosini
Ennominae
Moths of Borneo